Haplopteris is a genus of vittarioid ferns, a member of subfamily Vittarioideae and family Pteridaceae.

Description
Like other vittarioids, the members of Haplopteris are epiphytes. The rhizome has a distinct upper and lower side, lacking radial symmetry, a characteristic that separates it from Radiovittaria. Leaves are borne in two ranks in a single plane, and are usually simple, occasionally forked. The leaves have a distinct costa (midrib). Most species have netlike leaf veins which form two rows of areolae (the "gaps" in the net) on either side of the midline; two species bear a single leaf vein only. The linear sori, in most species, are confined to a commissural vein (paralleling the edge of the leaf margin and set just back from it, joining the ends of the netted veins); in the two species with a single vein, the sori follow that vein. The sori bear paraphyses (minute hairs) with a cell at the tip shaped like an inverted cone, separating it from Vittaria sensu stricto, with slender paraphyses.

Taxonomy
The genus was first described by Carl Borivoj Presl in 1836, separating it from Pteris sensu Bory. He named it Haplopteris, from the Greek words for "simple" and "fern", in token of the simple fronds typical of the genus. He placed it in tribe Adiantaceae rather than Vittariaceae, although he recognized the similarity of the venation to Vittaria. Presl transferred Bory's Pteris scolopendrina to the genus as the type species.

Molecular phylogenetic studies have shown that the type species of Monogramma is embedded in Haplopteris. Since the name Monogramma has taxonomic priority over Haplopteris, a proposal to reject Monogramma in favor of Haplopteris has been put forth to conserve the name and comparatively stable circumscription of Haplopteris. Thus far, the conservation of Haplopteris has been recommended by the Nomenclature Committee for Vascular Plants.

Distribution
About ten species are native to tropical Africa and the Indian Ocean, while the rest are found in tropical Asia and the Pacific.

Species
Schuettpelz et al. estimated the genus to contain about 40 species. The bulk of them were transferred out of Vittaria by Edmund H. Crane in 1998. 38 have currently been named:
Haplopteris alternans (Copel.) S.Linds. & C.W.Chen
Haplopteris amboinensis (Fée) X.C.Zhang
Haplopteris anguste-elongata (Hayata) E.H.Crane
Haplopteris angustifolia (Blume) E.H.Crane
Haplopteris angustissima (Holttum) S.Linds.
Haplopteris capillaris (Copel.) C.W.Chen, S.Linds. & K.T.Yong
Haplopteris dareicarpa (Hook.) S.Linds. & C.W.Chen
Haplopteris doniana (Mett. ex Hieron.) E.H.Crane
Haplopteris elongata (Sw.) E.H.Crane
Haplopteris ensata (Christ) C.W.Chen & S.Linds.
Haplopteris ensiformis (Sw.) E.H.Crane
Haplopteris flexuosa (Fée) E.H.Crane
Haplopteris forrestiana (Ching) E.H.Crane
Haplopteris fudzinoi (Makino) E.H.Crane
Haplopteris guineensis (Desv.) E.H.Crane
Haplopteris hainanensis (C.Chr.) E.H.Crane
Haplopteris heterophylla C.W.Chen, Y.H.Chang & Yea C.Liu
Haplopteris himalayensis (Ching) E.H.Crane
Haplopteris hirta (Fée) S.Linds.
Haplopteris humblotii (Hieron.) S.Linds. & C.W.Chen
Haplopteris linearifolia (Ching) X.C.Zhang
Haplopteris longicoma (Christ) E.H.Crane
Haplopteris malayensis (Holttum) E.H.Crane
Haplopteris mediosora (Hayata) X.C.Zhang
Haplopteris microlepis (Hieron.) Mazumdar
Haplopteris mindanaoensis S.Linds. & C.W.Chen
Haplopteris modesta (Hand.-Mazz.) E.H.Crane
Haplopteris owariensis (Fée) E.H.Crane
Haplopteris plurisulcata (Ching) X.C.Zhang
Haplopteris schliebenii (Reimers) Schuettp.
Haplopteris scolopendrina C.Presl
Haplopteris sessilifrons (Miyam. & H.Ohba) S.Linds.
Haplopteris sikkimensis (Kuhn) E.H.Crane
Haplopteris taeniophylla (Copel.) E.H.Crane
Haplopteris volkensii (Hieron.) E.H.Crane
Haplopteris winitii (Tagawa & K.Iwats.) S.Linds.
Haplopteris yakushimensis C.W.Chen & Ebihara
Haplopteris zosterifolia (Willd.) E.H.Crane

If the proposal to conserve Haplopteris against Monogramma is accepted, M. graminea will have to be transferred to Haplopteris to maintain the monophyly of the genus.

References

Pteridaceae
Epiphytes
Fern genera